Eddy is an unincorporated community in Kay County, Oklahoma, United States. It is seven miles southwest of Blackwell. The community was originally called Osborne, but its name was changed to Eddy on January 3, 1901. It was named "Eddy" after Ed E. Peckham, who was the son of railroad developer E.L. Peckham. A post office operated in Eddy but closed on February 22, 1957.

References

Unincorporated communities in Kay County, Oklahoma
Unincorporated communities in Oklahoma